Faustus of Milan was a soldier, who suffered martyrdom, at Milan, Italy, in 190.

References

Italian saints
190 deaths
2nd-century Christian martyrs
Year of birth unknown